Bardot were an Australian girl group which formed in 1999 on the Australian reality television series Popstars.

Aired in 1999, Popstars attracted high ratings and significant media exposure, resulting in the instant success of Bardot's debut single "Poison" and debut album Bardot, both which entered the Australian and New Zealand charts at number 1. 
In 2001, the group released a second album Play It Like That, featuring the top 5 ARIA singles "ASAP" and "I Need Somebody", before parting ways in early 2002.

History

1999–2000: Formation via Popstars and Bardot
The members of Bardot were selected on the Seven Network's first series of Popstars, a talent show which set about producing a five-piece girl group. The Australian series was only second to the New Zealand version which produced the group True Bliss. The act would be sponsored by the Austereo radio network, New Idea magazine and signed to Warner Music Group.

In 1999, over 2,500 hopefuls turned up to auditions around the country which required both singing and dancing experience. The judges consisted of radio broadcaster Jackie O, Warner Music executive Chris Moss, and Grant Thomas Management manager Michael Napthali (who would manage the group's career).

After numerous elimination rounds, Chantelle Barry, Belinda Chapple, Sophie Monk, Sally Polihronas and Katie Underwood were given tickets to fly to Sydney to record their debut single, and the five women moved in together.

Controversy occurred when Barry suddenly departed the still-unnamed group with no public explanation on the program. Rumours in magazines and newspapers suggested she had been caught stealing items from other members. Six years later in 2006, Barry appeared on the program Where Are They Now? to speak for the first time about the incident; Barry would further elaborate about what happened in later interviews. Barry states that she had taken Monk's weekly $100 money allowance (which was left in Barry's room) with the intention of giving it back to her, but forgot to do so and was therefore removed from the group. Subsequently she was paid $1000 and offered a solo record deal to leave and keep quiet on the matter, and later blamed her actions on her youth and naivety.  Polihronas would later state that Barry was "exploited" by the show and made out to be "the villain". 

As a result of that departure, judges selected Newcastle singer, Tiffany Wood (now spelled Tiffani Wood) as the fifth member. The name "Bardot" was chosen by Monk after the French actress Brigitte Bardot. The program followed the group during its recording sessions, photo and music video shoots and other promotional commitments such as showcases and instores.

Airing three years prior to the first season of Australian Idol, the show was considered a unique and fresh format at the time, and attracted on average, more than 2.6 million viewers per episode, making it one of the most successful, highest-rating programs of 2000. The series was nominated for "Most Popular Reality Program" at the 2001 Logie Awards.

The success of Popstars led to national media coverage with reports on the women daily and the band's instore signings attracted thousands of fans. This overwhelming exposure translated into major record sales.

The debut single "Poison" entered the ARIA singles chart at number 1, selling over 60,000 copies in its first week. It gained double platinum status, remaining in the top spot for two consecutive weeks. The self-titled debut album also entered the charts at number 1. Bardot set a new sales record by becoming the "first Australian act to debut at the number 1 position with both its debut single and debut album". The album would go on to sell over double platinum copies and was the 20th highest selling album in Australia for 2000.

Bardot repeated the same results with its debut single and album in New Zealand, where "Poison" spent three consecutive weeks at number 1.

Second single, "I Should've Never Let You Go" made its television debut at the end of the final episode of Popstars and peaked at number 14 on the ARIA singles chart. During this time, Bardot made a promotional trip to Singapore and other parts of Asia, where the group had attracted a large fanbase. The album reached number 2 in Singapore while "I Should've Never Let You Go" reached number 1.

"These Days", was chosen as the album's third and final single, peaking at number 19 in Australia.

In August 2000, Bardot embarked on its first national concert tour of Australia where one Melbourne critic wrote, "it was when they covered the Jackson's "Can You Feel It" and DeBarge's "Rhythm of the Night" that you could see how good they might be with great songs. Bardot have come along way..."

At the ARIA Music Awards of 2000 Bardot were nominated for ARIA Award for Highest Selling Single, ARIA Award for Highest Selling Album and ARIA Award for Best Video. They group performed "These Days" at the award ceremony.

2001–2002: Departure of Underwood and Play It Like That
In March 2001, Bardot released "Poison" in the United Kingdom and appeared on a number of shows including SMTV Live, Top of the Pops and Pepsi Chart. The single was only a limited success, peaking at number 45 on the UK Singles Chart.

Whilst in the UK, Bardot began work on their second album, recording songs with Swedish production team Murlyn. This collaboration resulted in three released tracks including the first single, "ASAP".

Prior to the single's release, Underwood decided to leave Bardot in pursuit of a role in the musical Hair, which subsequently failed to commence due to lack of finances. Bardot also parted ways with Grant Thomas Management, signing with David Caplice Management to "better our career and...(be) in a good position, creatively as owners of Bardot", according to Polihronas.

"ASAP" was released in July 2001 and presented an edgier and more confident look and sound for Bardot. The new direction was successful, "ASAP" reaching the ARIA top 5 and becoming their fourth gold single.

In August 2001, Bardot performed a cover of the Village People song "Go West" at the opening ceremony of the 2001 Goodwill Games in Brisbane and in October, released the second single from their second album, "I Need Somebody". The single gained a positive reception from critics with comparisons to the dance-pop music of Kylie Minogue being made. It confirmed the group's staying power, peaking Top 5 and becoming Bardot's longest charting hit since "Poison".

In November 2001, Bardot released their second album, Play It Like That, which featured co-writes by all members and received critical acclaim from many critics who believed Bardot would not last past their first album. The album debuted at number 16 on the ARIA album charts and was certified gold status, but continued to drop in the weeks following, only spending seven weeks in the Top 100.

In February 2002, the group released its final single, "Love Will Find a Way", which completed Bardot's string of consecutive top 20 singles by peaking at number 18. In March, Bardot embarked on its second national tour with Australian boy band Human Nature, playing sell-out shows in theatres across the country, and the following month, travelled to Malaysia to perform at the International Indian Film Academy Awards.

2002: Break-up
In April 2002, Bardot announced its decision to split. An official statement read: "Bardot confirm their mutual decision to end the group's career. Belinda Chapple, Sophie Monk, Sally Polihronas and Tiffany Wood have cited the need for a well earned break following what has been a phenomenal 2.5-year explosion on the Australian music scene. The pace at which the group's career continued from its inception at the first Australian Popstars TV show auditions to the completion of a 3rd single from their second album Play It Like That has taken its toll."

The group performed a farewell concert for Channel V and made their final appearance together for a charity event on 2 May in Sydney.

The decision to break up came as a surprise to many in the industry who believed Bardot was in the process of establishing a strong and credible reputation. Rumours circulated that the split was a result of Monk's desire to begin a solo career, though she denied this. In 2004, during an interview with FHM magazine, Polihronas revealed, "I think when Sophie went solo, everyone assumed that it was she who broke up the band, which wasn't right. I don't know whether I should say this, but I wanted out for a long time. Sophie and I both knew that we were going to fulfil the last album and then move on, but Sophie stayed with the management, and continued on. I took a whole year off without even thinking about it." Soon after Bardot's split, Wood confirmed that at the time, both she and Chapple were the two members keen to continue as Bardot.

2003–2021: Later years and 20th anniversary celebrations
All members, apart from Sally, went on to release solo music with varying levels of success before forging careers in different fields.

In April 2004, Bardot's original management team Grant Thomas Management sued the Popstars producer Screentime and its joint venture company Five Divas, for up to $750,000 for breach of contract and loss of earnings. In November 2000, Bardot sacked Grant Thomas Management midway through a three-year contract because according to Screentime, Bardot had "lost all confidence" in the ability of Grant Thomas Management to effectively manage their careers. Grant Thomas believed they were unfairly dumped and were successfully awarded $129,561.

In 2009, Wood and Underwood professionally reunited for the stage musical Valentino composed by David Tyyd, based on the life of Rudolph Valentino. In 2019, after years of being commercially unavailable, both of Bardot's albums were added to streaming services such as Spotify and Apple Music.

In April 2020, to commemorate the 20th anniversary of the release of their debut single "Poison", three of the members (Wood, Underwood and Chapple) reunited remotely online to perform the song. Chantelle Barry would also independently release her own version of "Poison" later that year. A greatest hits album, comprising their six singles and several album tracks, was originally released on vinyl in January 2021 with digital release in April. A remix compilation album containing remixes of their singles, plus b-sides and a previously unreleased track, "Something Worth Fighting for", was released in the same month as the digital release of their greatest hits album. In June, both studio albums by Bardot were re-issued on vinyl for the first time ever as part of the band's 20th anniversary celebrations. In July 2021, an EP of new 2021 remixes was released featuring tracks from the group's debut album.

2021–present: Ka'Bel mini reunion
In September 2021, it was announced that two former members, Katie Underwood and Belinda Chapple, have professionally reunited as a duo under the name Ka'Bel, with their debut single "Broken Hearted" released on 15 October.

Tours
National Tour
13–26 August 2000
Here and Now – The Bardot / Human Nature Tour
1–15 March 2002

Lineups

Discography

Studio albums

Compilations

Extended plays

Singles

Home videos

Music videos

Awards and nominations

ARIA Music Awards
The ARIA Music Awards is an annual awards ceremony that recognises excellence, innovation, and achievement across all genres of Australian music. Bardot were nominated for three awards.

|-
! scope="row" rowspan="3"| 2000
| Bardot
| ARIA Award for Highest Selling Album
| 
|-
| "Poison"
| ARIA Award for Highest Selling Single
| 
|-
| "Poison" (Directed by Mark Hartley)
| ARIA Award for Best Video
| 
|-

Logie Awards
The Logie Awards is an annual gathering to celebrate Australian television, sponsored and organised by magazine TV Week. The awards are presented in categories representing both public and industry voted awards.
|-
! scope="row" rowspan="1"| 2001
| Popstars
| Logie Award for Most Popular Reality Program
| 
|-

References

Musical groups established in 1999
Musical groups disestablished in 2002
Australian girl groups
Australian pop music groups
Popstars winners
Australian electronic dance music groups
1999 establishments in Australia